The Argus As 292 was originally developed in 1939 as a small, remote-controlled unmanned anti-aircraft target drone. A short-range reconnaissance version was also developed. The success of the project led to the Argus Fernfeuer UAV proposal.

Development
The As 292 was designed by Dr. Ing. Fritz Gosslau at Argus Motoren GmbH. Work began on the drone in 1937 at the Argus-Flugmotorenwerke (Argus aero-engine factory) in Berlin-Reinickendorf. Apart from Argus, two other companies were involved in the production of the As 292: Deutsche Forschungsanstalt für Segelflug supplied technical assistance with the airframe construction; C. Lorenz Company with the radio-control system. At DFS the drone was referred to as Model 12.

As a target for anti-aircraft gunners, the As 292 was given the designation of Flakzielgerät 43 (Flak-Target Apparatus 43). An earlier effort in 1937 at developing an aircraft-sized target drone, the Fieseler Fi 157, ended in failure.

The first As 292 made the type's first unguided flight on 9 June 1937. The first remotely-controlled flight was made on 14 May 1939. During flight testing, cameras were fitted to a prototype As 292. Testing of this Aufklärungsgerät (reconnaissance device) version started in early 1939 and first aerial photography was made on 2 October 1939. After successful demonstrations Argus received an initial production order for 100 As 292 aircraft in late 1939. Ordered aircraft were delivered in 1942–43. The airframe was of simple tubular construction; the high dihedral wings were removable for when the As 292 was being transported.

At least one As 292 was painted in overall red with white strips.

Operators

Luftwaffe

Specifications

References
 Holsken, Dieter, V-missiles of the Third Reich the V-1 and V-2 (1994), pp. 46–49, 343. Primary source for much of the information are the personal documents of Fritz Gosslau.
 Luftfahrt international, Aufklärungsgerät "Fernfeuer" Argus As 292. Luftfahrt international, 16, 1976, pp. 2511–2519.
 Späte, Wolfgang, Test Pilots (1999). Includes section entitled Large Radio-Controlled Model Aircraft (Erich Klöckner, Trial Reports from DFS where the author narrates how regular pilots were required to observe trials of drones).

292
World War II aircraft of Germany
1930s German military reconnaissance aircraft
Target drones of Germany
Aircraft first flown in 1937
Low-wing aircraft
Single-engined tractor aircraft